A mental test may refer to:

A mental status examination
A procedure in psychological testing
An IQ test
A puzzle